Council for Public Health and the Problems of Demography (CPHD) is a non-governmental nonprofit organization of Russia, that deals with such problems as alcoholism, tobacco smoking and age-related problems. Methods of work: researching the problem, drawing attention to the problem of society and state structures in all possible ways, developing and promoting possible solutions, interacting with the media and state structures, tracking the dynamics of the situation.

CPHD coordinates its work with a number of Russian and international organization (such as the International Longevity Alliance).

References

Literature

External links
 

Health advocacy groups
Advocacy groups in Russia
Non-profit organizations based in Russia
Organizations established in 2005